Anyangcheon-ro is an road located in Seoul and Gyeonggi Province, South Korea.

Stopovers
 Gyeonggi Province
 Gwangmyeong 
 Seoul
 Geumcheon District
 Gyeonggi Province
 Gwangmyeong
 Seoul
 Guro District - Yangcheon District - Gangseo District

List of Facilities 
IS: Intersection, IC: Interchange

References

Roads in Seoul
Roads in Gyeonggi